Vadym Vyacheslavovych Plotnikov (born 12 April 1968 in Kirovsk, Ukrainian SSR) is a former Ukrainian footballer. He worked as a head coach of FC Stal Alchevsk in the Ukrainian First League.

There are argument whether he is the best top scorer of Ukrainian First League. With 118 goals Plotnikov is listed on top of the all-time list, however some statistics trackers insist that some goals were added to him without confirmation and he should be sharing his title with Serhiy Chuichenko.

References

External links
 Biography  

1968 births
Living people
People from Kirovsk, Luhansk Oblast
Ukrainian footballers
Ukrainian football managers
FC Stal Alchevsk players
FC Shakhtar Stakhanov players
FC Stal Alchevsk managers
Association football forwards
Sportspeople from Luhansk Oblast